Daniel Dawson Hepala Hakuole Ching, is a professional standup paddleboarder from Redondo Beach, California, United States.

Achievements
 Winner of the 2010 Rainbow Sandals Battle of the Paddle (standup paddle boarding World Championship) Elite Race.
 3rd-place finish at the 2011 Rainbow Sandals Battle of the Paddle Elite Race.
 Winner of the 2012 Rainbow Sandals Battle of the Paddle Elite Race
 3rd-place finish at the 2013 Rainbow Sandals Battle of the Paddle Elite Race.
 3rd-place finish at the 2014 Rainbow Sandals Battle of the Paddle Elite Race.
 Two-time winner of the Molokai Solo Outrigger World Championship, in 2010 and 2013.
 Winner of The Wild Buffalo Relay (With partner Ryland Hart).

References

Living people
Year of birth missing (living people)